was a Japanese author who is considered to be one of the most prominent figures in modern Japanese literature. The tone and subject matter of his work ranges from shocking depictions of sexuality and destructive erotic obsessions to subtle portrayals of the dynamics of family life within the context of the rapid changes in 20th-century Japanese society. Frequently, his stories are narrated in the context of a search for cultural identity in which constructions of the West and Japanese tradition are juxtaposed.

He was one of six authors on the final shortlist for the Nobel Prize in Literature in 1964, the year before his death.

Biography

Early life
Tanizaki was born into a well-to-do merchant class family in Nihonbashi, Tokyo, where his uncle owned a printing press, which had been established by his grandfather. His parents were Kuragorō and Seki Tanizaki. His older brother, Kumakichi, died three days after his birth, which made him the next eldest son of the family. Tanizaki had three younger brothers: Tokuzō, Seiji (also a writer) and Shūhei, as well three younger sisters: Sono, Ise and Sue. Tanizaki described his admittedly pampered childhood in his Yōshō Jidai (Childhood Years, 1956). His childhood home was destroyed in the 1894 Meiji Tokyo earthquake, to which Tanizaki later attributed his lifelong fear of earthquakes. His family's finances declined dramatically as he grew older until he was forced to reside in another household as a tutor.

Despite these financial problems, he attended the Tokyo First Middle School, where he became acquainted with Isamu Yoshii. Tanizaki attended the Literature Department of Tokyo Imperial University from 1908, but was forced to drop out in 1911 because of his inability to pay for tuition.

Early literary career

Tanizaki began his literary career in 1909. His first work, a one-act stage play, was published in a literary magazine that he had helped found. Tanizaki's name first became widely known with the publication of the short story Shisei (The Tattooer, 1910). In the story, a tattoo artist inscribes a giant spider on the body of a beautiful young woman. Afterwards, the woman's beauty takes on a demonic, compelling power, in which eroticism is combined with sado-masochism. The femme-fatale is a theme repeated in many of Tanizaki's early works, including Kirin (1910), Shonen (The Children, 1911), Himitsu (The Secret, 1911), and Akuma (Devil, 1912). Tanizaki's other works published in the Taishō period include Shindo (1916) and Oni no men (1916), which are partly autobiographical.

Tanizaki married his first wife, Chiyo Ishikawa, in 1915, and his only child, Ayuko, was born in 1916. However, it was an unhappy marriage, and in time he encouraged a relationship between Chiyo and his friend and fellow writer Haruo Satō. The psychological stress of this situation is reflected in some of his early works, including the stage play Aisureba koso (Because I Love Her, 1921) and the novel Kami to hito no aida (Between Men and the Gods, 1924). Even though some of Tanizaki's writings seem to have been inspired by these and other persons and events in his life, his works are far less autobiographical than those of most of his contemporaries in Japan. Tanizaki later adopted Emiko, the daughter of his third wife, Matsuko Morita.

In 1918, Tanizaki toured Chōsen, northern China, and Manchuria. In his early years he became infatuated with the West and all things modern. In 1922, he relocated from Odawara, where he had been living since 1919, to Yokohama, which had a large expatriate population, living briefly in a Western-style house and leading a bohemian lifestyle. This outlook is reflected in some of his early writings.

Tanizaki had a brief career in silent cinema, working as a script writer for the Taikatsu film studio. He was a supporter of the Pure Film Movement and was instrumental in bringing modernist themes to Japanese film. He wrote the scripts for the films Amateur Club (1922) and A Serpent's Lust (1923) (based on the story of the same title by Ueda Akinari, which was, in part, the inspiration for Mizoguchi Kenji's 1953 masterpiece Ugetsu monogatari). Some have argued that Tanizaki's relation to cinema is important to understanding his overall career.

Period in Kyoto

Tanizaki's reputation began to take off in 1923, when he moved to Kyoto after the Great Kanto earthquake, which destroyed his house in Yokohama (at the time Tanizaki was on a bus in Hakone and thus escaped injury). The loss of Tokyo's historic buildings and neighborhoods in the quake triggered a change in his enthusiasms, as he redirected his youthful love for the imagined West and modernity into a renewed interest in Japanese aesthetics and culture, particularly the culture of the Kansai region (around the cities of Osaka, Kobe and Kyoto). His first novel after the earthquake, and his first truly successful novel, was Chijin no ai (Naomi, 1924-25), which is a tragicomic exploration of class, sexual obsession, and cultural identity. Tanizaki made another trip to China in 1926, where he met Guo Moruo, with whom he later maintained correspondence. He relocated from Kyoto to Kobe in 1928.

Inspired by the Osaka dialect, Tanizaki wrote Manji (Quicksand, 1928–1929), in which he explored lesbianism, among other themes. This was followed by the classic Tade kuu mushi (Some Prefer Nettles, 1928–29), which depicts the gradual self-discovery of a Tokyo man living near Osaka, in relation to Western-influenced modernization and Japanese tradition. Yoshino kuzu (Arrowroot, 1931) alludes to Bunraku and kabuki theater and other traditional forms even as it adapts a European narrative-within-a-narrative technique. His experimentation with narrative styles continued with Ashikari (The Reed Cutter, 1932), Shunkinsho (A Portrait of Shunkin, 1933), and many other works that combine traditional aesthetics with Tanizaki's particular obsessions.

His renewed interest in classical Japanese literature culminated in his multiple translations into modern Japanese of the eleventh-century classic The Tale of Genji and in his masterpiece Sasameyuki (literally "A Light Snowfall," but published in English translation as The Makioka Sisters, 1943–1948), a detailed characterization of four daughters of a wealthy Osaka merchant family who see their way of life slipping away in the early years of World War II. The sisters live a cosmopolitan life with European neighbors and friends, without suffering the cultural-identity crises common to earlier Tanizaki characters. When he began to serialize the novel, the editors of the literary magazine Chūō Kōron were warned that it did not contribute to the needed war spirit and, fearful of losing supplies of paper, cut off the serialization.

Tanizaki relocated to the resort town of Atami, Shizuoka in 1942, but returned to Kyoto in 1946.

Post-war period

After World War II, Tanizaki again emerged into literary prominence, winning a host of awards. Until his death, he was widely regarded as Japan's greatest contemporary author. He won the prestigious Asahi Prize in 1948, was awarded the Order of Culture by the Japanese government in 1949, and in 1964 was elected to honorary membership in the American Academy and Institute of Arts and Letters, the first Japanese writer to be so honoured.

His first major post-war work was Shōshō Shigemoto no haha (Captain Shigemoto's Mother, 1949–1950), which includes a restatement of Tanizaki's frequent theme of a son's longing for his mother. The novel also introduces a new theme, of sexuality in old age, which reappears in later works such as Kagi (The Key, 1956). Kagi is a psychological novel in which an aging professor arranges for his wife to commit adultery in order to boost his own sagging sexual desires.

Tanizaki returned to Atami in 1950, and was designated a Person of Cultural Merit by the Japanese government in 1952. He suffered from paralysis of the right hand from 1958, and was hospitalized for Angina pectoris in 1960. Tanizaki's characters are often driven by obsessive erotic desires. In one of his last novels, Futen Rojin Nikki (Diary of a Mad Old Man, 1961–1962), the aged diarist is struck down by a stroke brought on by an excess of sexual excitement. He records both his past desires and his current efforts to bribe his daughter-in-law to provide sexual titillation in return for Western baubles. In 1964, Tanizaki moved to Yugawara, Kanagawa, southwest of Tokyo, where he died of a heart attack on 30 July 1965, shortly after celebrating his 79th birthday. His grave is at the temple Hōnen-in, in Kyoto.

Legacy 
The Tanizaki Prize is one of Japan's most sought-after literary awards. Established in 1965 by the publishing company Chūō Kōronsha, it is awarded annually to a work of fiction or drama.

Before Haruki Murakami had achieved wide renown, Tanizaki was frequently considered one of the "Big Three" postwar Japanese writers along with Yasunari Kawabata and Yukio Mishima.

Bibliography

Selected works

Works published in English 
 Some Prefer Nettles, tr. Edward Seidensticker, Alfred A. Knopf 1955, Vintage Press 1995. 
 The Makioka Sisters, tr. Edward Seidensticker, Alfred A. Knopf 1957, Vintage Press 1995. 
 The Key and Diary of a Mad Old Man, tr. Howard Hibbert, Alfred A. Knopf 1960 and 1965 respectively, reissued in a single volume by Vintage Press 2004. 
 Seven Japanese Tales, tr. Howard Hibbett, Alfred A. Knopf 1963. 
 In Praise of Shadows, tr. Thomas J. Harper and Edward G. Seidensticker, Leete's Island Books 1977, Charles E. Tuttle 1984.
 Naomi, tr. Anthony H. Chambers, Alfred A. Knopf 1985, Vintage Press 2001. 
 Childhood Years: A Memoir, tr. Paul McCarthy, Kodansha International 1988. . Reissued by the University of Michigan Press, 2017.
 A Cat, a Man, and Two Women, tr. Paul McCarthy, Kodansha International 1990.  Reissued by New Directions, 2016.
 The Secret History of the Lord of Musashi and Arrowroot, tr. Anthony H. Chambers, Alfred A. Knopf 1982, Vintage Press 2003. 
 Quicksand, tr. Howard Hibbett, Alfred A. Knopf 1993, Vintage Press 1995. 
 The Reed Cutter and Captain Shigemoto's Mother, tr. Anthony H. Chambers, Alfred A. Knopf 1993.
 Memoir of Forgetting the Capital: Miyakowasure no ki, tr. by Amy V. Heinrich, Foreword by Donald Keene, Yushodo/Columbia University Press, 2010.
 The Gourmet Club: A Sextet, tr. Anthony H. Chambers and Paul McCarthy, Kodansha International 2001. . Reissued by the University of Michigan Press, 2017.
 Red Roofs and Other Stories, tr. Anthony H. Chambers and Paul McCarthy, University of Michigan Press, 2016.
 Devils in Daylight, tr. by J. Keith Vincent, New Directions, 2017.
 The Maids. tr. by Michael P. Cronin, New Directions, 2017
 "The Jester." tr. by Howard Hibbett. In A Tokyo Anthology: Literature from Japan’s Modern Metropolis, 1850-1915, ed. by Sumie Jones and Charles S. Inouye, pp. 268–280. University of Hawai’i Press, 2017.
 In Black and White, tr. by Phyllis I. Lyons, Columbia University Press (2018).
 Longing and Other Stories, tr. Anthony H. Chambers and Paul McCarthy, Columbia University Press 2022.

Adaptations

Tanizaki's works have repeatedly been adapted into films:
 Torawakamaru the Koga Ninja (1957)
 Akuto (1965), based on the play Kaoyo
 Sanka (1972), based on the story Shunkinshō

See also
 The Moon in the Water: Understanding Tanizaki, Kawabata, and Mishima

References

Further reading 

 
 Bienati, Luisa, and Bonaventura Ruperti, eds.  The Grand Old Man and the Great Tradition: Essays on Tanizaki Jun'ichirō in Honor of Adriana Boscaro. University of Michigan Press (2009). 
 Boscaro, Adriana, et al., eds. Tanizaki in Western Languages: A Bibliography of Translations and Studies. University of Michigan Press (1999). 
 Boscaro, Adriana and Anthony Hood Chambers, eds. A Tanizaki Feast:  The International Symposium in Venice. University of Michigan Press (1994). 
 Chambers, Anthony Hood. The Secret Window:  Ideal Worlds in Tanizaki's Fiction. Harvard University Asia Center (1994). 
 Chambers, Anthony Hood. Remembering Tanizaki Jun'ichiro and Matsuko: Diary Entries, Interview Notes, and Letters, 1954-1989. University of Michigan Press (2017). 
 Gessel, Van C. Three Modern Novelists. Kodansha International (1994). 
 Hibbett, Howard. Tanizaki: Fiction, Fantasy, and Artful Memories. Highmoonoon (2020).
 Ito, Ken Kenneth. Visions of Desire:  Tanizaki's Fictional Worlds. Stanford University Press (1991). 
 Jansen, Marius B.  (2000). The Making of Modern Japan. Cambridge: Harvard University Press. ; OCLC 44090600
 Keene, Donald. Dawn to the West. Columbia University Press (1998). .
 
 Long, Margherita. This Perversion Called Love: Reading Tanizaki, Feminist Theory, and Freud. Stanford University Press (2009).

External links 

 Jun'ichirō Tanizaki grave info
 
 

1886 births
1965 deaths
20th-century Japanese novelists
Writers from Tokyo
University of Tokyo alumni
Recipients of the Order of Culture
Japanese erotica writers